The Prins van Oranje class were two minelayers of the Royal Netherlands Navy, built to serve in the Dutch East Indies. The construction of the ships began in 1930 and was completed in 1932. The ships were built by the De Maas shipyard in Slikkerveer.  Both ships were still in service during the Second World War. Both ships were stationed in the Dutch East Indies, and both ships were lost in the war with Japan.

Ships in class 
  (1932–1942)
  (1932–1942)

Sources
 netherlandsnavy.nl :: Prins van Oranje-class minelayers 

Mine warfare vessel classes
Minelayers of the Royal Netherlands Navy